Richard Edward Woit (July 5, 1931 – May 31, 2007) was an American football defensive back. He played for the Detroit Lions in 1955.

He died of a heart attack on May 31, 2007, in Chicago, Illinois at age 75.

References

1931 births
2007 deaths
Players of American football from Chicago
American football defensive backs
Arkansas State Red Wolves football players
Detroit Lions players